is a folk custom found in the Tyrol region of central Europe. Occurring on set occasions, the ceremony involves two groups of locals fighting against one another using wooden canes and sticks. Both groups are masked, one as 'beautiful' and the other as 'ugly' .

Activity 
There were already established pagan traditions in the Alpine regions that became intertwined with Catholicism. The  were looked at with suspicion by the Catholic Church and banned by some civil authorities. Due to sparse population and rugged environments within the Alpine region, the ban was not effective or easily enforced, rendering the ban useless.

As a part of this, they blackened their faces, wore their hair long and sometimes exposed their breasts. In the mid-20th century, one old woman was recorded as saying that when she was young she remembered seeing a female  from the Styrian municipality of Donnersbach who carried a swaddled baby. She related that many of the women dressed as  would let one breast hang out, but that they were so well disguised that "no one needed to be ashamed."

Interpretations 

He also compared it to the case of the Livonian werewolf, arguing that they all represent a clash between the forces of order and chaos.

See also 
 Krampuslauf

References

Bibliography 
Academic sources

External links 
 

Alpine folklore
European folklore
Ritual animal disguise